Khosrow Shir Mosque is related to the Seljuq dynasty and is located in Razavi Khorasan Province, Khosrow Shir.

References

Gallery 

Mosques in Iran
Mosque buildings with domes
National works of Iran
Ruins in Iran
Seljuk architecture